The Issachar Plateau or Issachar Heights is a basalt plateau in the eastern part of Lower Galilee. 
It is bounded by the Tabor Stream in the north and the Harod Valley in the south and  Givat HaMoreh  in the west and the Jordan Valley in the east. Its area is about 115 km2.

The plateau is named after the Tribe of Issachar.

The  runs across the plateau into the Jordan Valley.

The plateau may be divided into three parts: רמת כוכב (Ramat Kochav, "Plateau of Stars"), רמת צבאים (Ramat Tzevaim "Plateau of Gazelles"; due to the population of Palestine mountain gazelle in the plateau), and ורמת תבור (Ramat Tavor, "Plateau of Tabor), with Issachar River separating Ramat Tzevaim from Ramat Kochav. Therefore, it is also referred in plural.

Landmarks and populated places

The Belvoir Castle national park and archeological site is a  Crusader castle on the eastern edge of the plateau, on the edge of Lower Galilee between the Sea of Galilee (20 km southwards) and Beit She'an.

Settlements include Moshav Moledet, Taibe, Ramat Tzvi, Beit HaShita,  Kfar Kish,  Menahamiya, Gesher, Yardena, Beit Yosef, Hamadya, Neve Ur, Sde Nahum, Na'ura, Tamra.

References

Mountains of Israel